is a Japanese snowboarder. He was a participant at the 2014 Winter Olympics in Sochi.

References

1994 births
Snowboarders at the 2014 Winter Olympics
Living people
Olympic snowboarders of Japan
Japanese male snowboarders
Asian Games medalists in snowboarding
Snowboarders at the 2017 Asian Winter Games
Asian Games bronze medalists for Japan
Medalists at the 2017 Asian Winter Games
Universiade medalists in snowboarding
Universiade gold medalists for Japan
Competitors at the 2015 Winter Universiade
21st-century Japanese people